Hans Peter Hallwachs (10 July 1938 – 16 December 2022) was a German actor.

Hallwachs was born in Jüterbog, Brandenburg on 10 July 1938. He died on 16 December 2022, at the age of 84.

Selected filmography

Mord und Totschlag (Degree of Murder, 1967)
Slap in the Face (1970)
Tatort:  (1971, TV)
Der Stoff, aus dem die Träume sind (The Stuff That Dreams Are Made of, 1972)
Ein ganz perfektes Ehepaar (1974)
Tatort:  (1977, TV)
 (50/50, 1977)
Fabian (1980)
Ich bin dein Killer (1982)
Am Ufer der Dämmerung (The Edge of Darkness, 1983)
Tatort:  (1984, TV)
 (The Summer of the Samurai, 1986)
 (1986, TV film)
Das Go! Projekt (1986, TV film)
 (Boundaries of Time: Caspar David Friedrich, 1986)
Wanderungen durch die Mark Brandenburg  (1986, TV miniseries)
 (Didi Drives Me Crazy, 1986)
Fatherland (1986)
Wann, wenn nicht jetzt (1987)
Derrick - Season 15, Episode 6: "Da läuft eine Riesensache" (1988, TV)
Hemingway (1988, TV miniseries)
 (1989)
 (1991, TV film)
Nie im Leben (1991)
 (Der Mann nebenan, 1992)
 (1993, TV miniseries)
 (1993, TV film)
 (1994)
Der Bulle von Tölz (1996-1998, TV series)
Der Mann ohne Schatten (1996, TV series)
Desert of Fire (1997, TV miniseries)
 (1999, TV film)
Alles Bob! (1999)
La Passion Schliemann (2000, TV film)
Hostile Takeover (2001)
So weit die Füße tragen (As Far as My Feet Will Carry Me, 2001)
 (The Troublemaker, 2003)
 (2003, TV film)
Rosenstrasse (2003)
Die Stunde der Offiziere (The Hour of the Officers, 2004, TV film)
(T)Raumschiff Surprise - Periode 1 (2004)
Mord mit Aussicht (2008-2014)
The Eremites (2016)

References

External links

Notabene Agency Grünwald 

1938 births
2022 deaths
20th-century German male actors
21st-century German male actors
German male film actors
German male television actors
People from Jüterbog